Seed Cane Creek is a  long 2nd order tributary to the Ararat River in Surry County, North Carolina.

Course
Seed Cane Creek rises in Sheltontown, North Carolina and then flows southwest to join the Ararat River at Mount Airy.

Watershed
Seed Cane Creek drains  of area, receives about 47.5 in/year of precipitation, has a wetness index of 351.11, and is about 46% forested.

See also
List of rivers of North Carolina

References

Rivers of North Carolina
Rivers of Surry County, North Carolina